Grosse Pointe Shores is a city in Macomb and Wayne County in the U.S. state of Michigan.  The population was 3,008 at the 2010 census.

Grosse Pointe Shores was incorporated as a village in 1911 and was part of Grosse Pointe Township in Wayne County and Lake Township in Macomb County.  Both townships became defunct with the village incorporated as a city in 2009.  It is a northeastern suburb of Metro Detroit and is the northernmost city included into the Grosse Pointe area.  Located along the shores of Lake St. Clair, the city is well known as the location of the Edsel and Eleanor Ford House and the Grosse Pointe Yacht Club.

History
Grosse Pointe Shores was incorporated as a village in 1911. The village incorporated as a city in 2009. In 2011, the city government stated that it is considering trying to move all of the city into Macomb County, since Macomb County has lower taxes than Wayne County.

Geography 

Demographics

2010 census
As of the census of 2010, there were 3,008 people, 1,201 households, and 911 families residing in the city. The racial makeup of the city was 92.8% White, 1.9% African American, 0.3% Native American, 3.8% Asian, 0.2% from other races, and 1.0% from two or more races. Hispanic or Latino of any race were 1.9% of the population.

There were 1,201 households, of which 24.6% had children under the age of 18 living with them, 68.0% were married couples living together, 4.8% had a female householder with no husband present, 3.0% had a male householder with no wife present, and 24.1% were non-families. 21.1% of all households were made up of individuals, and 13.6% had someone living alone who was 65 years of age or older. The average household size was 2.50 and the average family size was 2.92.

The median age in the city was 52.2 years. 19.6% of residents were under the age of 18; 5.1% were between the ages of 18 and 24; 14.2% were from 25 to 44; 33.5% were from 45 to 64; and 27.6% were 65 years of age or older. The gender makeup of the city was 50.1% male and 49.9% female.

2000 census
As of the census of 2000, there were 2,823 people, 1,058 households, and 859 families residing in the village. The racial makeup of the village was 93.80% White, 0.60% African American, 0.25% Native American, 4.07% Asian, 0.43% from other races, and 0.85% from two or more races. Hispanic or Latino of any race were 1.74% of the population.

There were 1,058 households, out of which 28.1% had children under the age of 18 living with them, 74.5% were married couples living together, 4.6% had a female householder with no husband present, and 18.8% were non-families. 17.1% of all households were made up of individuals, and 12.5% had someone living alone who was 65 years of age or older. The average household size was 2.67 and the average family size was 3.01.

The median income for a household in the village was $222,882, and the median income for a family was $289,680. This makes Grosse Pointe Shores the twenty-first wealthiest city in the United States and the wealthiest in the State of Michigan, for towns with over 1000 residents. Males had a median income of $100,000 versus $59,375 for females. The per capita income for the village was $197,639. About 2.7% of families and 3.0% of the population were below the poverty line, including 4.6% of those under age 18 and 3.4% of those age 65 or over.

Education
The city lies within two separate school districts.

The portion in Wayne County is within the Grosse Pointe Public School System. Residents of the GPPSS area are divided between Ferry Elementary School and Monteith Elementary School, and all residents of that section are zoned to Parcells Middle School and Grosse Pointe North High School; all of these schools are in Grosse Pointe Woods.

The portion of the community in Macomb County is within the South Lake School District.

Notable people

 Edsel Ford, son of Henry Ford, and president of Ford Motor Company
 William Clay Ford Sr., grandson of Henry Ford, son of Edsel Ford
 Manuel Moroun, billionaire businessman, owner of the Ambassador Bridge
 Art Van Elslander, founder of Art Van and philanthropist, lived there for over 20 years.
 Ralph Wilson, founder, owner, and president of the Buffalo Bills

References

External links 

 Village of Grosse Pointe Shores official site
 Grosse Pointe Historical Society

Villages in Macomb County, Michigan
Lake St. Clair
Metro Detroit
Coastal resorts in Michigan
Michigan populated places on Lake St. Clair
Populated places established in 1911
1911 establishments in Michigan